Karosa ŠM 16,5 was prototype of an urban bus built by bus manufacturer Karosa from the Czech Republic, in 1968. It was succeeded by Karosa B 741 in 1991.

Construction features 
Karosa ŠM 16,5 is completely different from its predecessor, Škoda 706 RTO-K, which had engine in front.
ŠM 16,5 is model of Karosa Š series. It is derived from Karosa ŠM 11 city bus, and also unified with long-distance coach Karosa ŠD 11. Body is semi-self-supporting with frame and engine with automatic gearbox in the middle, between the wheels. Only rear axle is propulsed. Front axle is independent, middle and rear axle is solid. All axles are mounted on air suspension. On the right side are four folding doors (first and last are narrower than middle doors). Inside are used leatherette seats. Drivers cab is not separated from the rest of the vehicle. In the rear part is room for a pram or wheelchair.

Production and operation 
The first prototype was built in 1968. 15 more buses were built after that.
Later production was halted because of a decision to import Ikarus 280 buses.
The last ŠM 16,5 buses were withdrawn in the 80´s.

Historical vehicles 
No ŠM 16,5 bus has been preserved.
However a replica is being built in Slovakia since 2012.

References

See also 
  TV show „Zašlapané projekty“, episode „Karosu pokořil Ikarus“ about bus ŠM 16,5, ceskatelevize.cz
  Photgallery of ŠM 16,5 in Brno, bmhd.cz
  Info about ŠM 16,5 in Nitra, imhd.sk
  Pages about building of replica of ŠM 16,5 a renovations of ŠL 11 a ŠD 11 

 List of buses

Articulated buses
Buses manufactured by Karosa
Buses of the Czech Republic